Western College, in Bristol, England, opened in 1906 as a theological college for the Congregational Union of England and Wales.  The building was designed by the Bristol architect Henry Dare Bryan, and given Grade II* listing in 1966.  It closed in 1968, and the building was subsequently used as the HQ of the Southern Universities Joint Examination Board, and since 1993 as a medical practice.

References

Former theological colleges in England
Congregationalism in the United Kingdom
University and college buildings completed in 1906
Grade II* listed buildings in Bristol